Zographus hieroglyphicus is a species of beetle in the family Cerambycidae. It was described by Carl Eduard Adolph Gerstaecker in 1855. It is known from Tanzania, Malawi, Kenya, and Mozambique.

References

Sternotomini
Beetles described in 1855